Siege of Louisbourg may refer to:

 Siege of Louisbourg (1745), the capture of the settlement by British forces during the War of the Austrian Succession
 Siege of Louisbourg (1758), the capture of the settlement by British forces during the Seven Years' War, after which it was permanently ceded to the British

See also
 Louisbourg Expedition
 Louisbourg Expedition (1757), a cancelled British plan to capture Louisbourg during the Seven Years' War
 Duc d'Anville Expedition (1746), a failed French attempt to capture Louisbourg